The following is a list of imperial elections in the Holy Roman Empire. Entries in italics are for elections where the claim of the man elected to be King of the Romans was disputed.

 
Holy Roman Empire
 
Imperial elections